The Men's U19 African Volleyball Championship is a sport competition for national teams with players under 19 years, currently held biannually and organized by the African Volleyball Confederation, the Africa volleyball federation.

Result summary

Performance by nation

See also
Girls' Africa Volleyball Championship U18

External links
Boys U19 African Championship Archive  - todor66.com

International volleyball competitions
Recurring sporting events established in 1994
African Volleyball Championships